The  AN/CYZ-9 is a hardware random number generator fielded by the US National Security Agency in the 1990s. It was used in initial phases of the US military's Electronic Key Management System (EKMS) Tier 2. These systems employ a commercial or militarized personal computer running MS-DOS to generate cryptographic keys and signal operating instructions (SOI/CEOI), with the CYZ-9 producing the needed random bits. The CYZ-9 connects to the PC through an RS-232 port and is powered by five D cell (BA-30) batteries. In later phases of EKMS, the random data functionality is included in an NSA key processor (KP).

References

Random number generation
Key management
Encryption device accessories
National Security Agency encryption devices
Military electronics of the United States